Microliobunum is a genus of harvestmen in the family Sclerosomatidae from the Middle East.

Species
 Microliobunum brevipes Roewer, 1912
 Microliobunum iranum (Roewer, 1952)

References

Harvestmen
Harvestman genera